Grabin  (German Krämersborn) is a village in the administrative district of Gmina Bytnica, within Krosno Odrzańskie County, Lubusz Voivodeship, in western Poland.

The village has a population of 250.

References

Grabin